Michael Ostendorfer (1490/1494, Ostendorf in Swabia, or Ostendorf in Hemau - December 1559, Regensburg) was a German painter, graphic artist and xylographer. Stylistically, he belongs to the Danube school and probably trained with Albrecht Altdorfer.

Biography 
He was employed by the Elector Palatine, Friedrich II, in Neumarkt, as a court painter. He moved to Regensburg in 1519, was married to Anna Wechin (c. 1498-1550), the daughter of a furrier, in 1528 and bought a house. During the 1520s, he worked for several printing shops. He appears to have been intermittently active as a court painter back in Neumarkt from 1535 to 1544, when Friedrich II moved to Heidelberg. At that time he was also known to be working for the printer and publisher, . After that, there is no record of his activities until 1549, when he acquired "Bürgerrechten" (citizenship) in Regensburg,  which had become Protestant in 1542.

He failed to receive a sufficient number of orders, which left him and his family in poverty. As a result, he was also deeply in debt and was often prevented from working by attacks of the gout. During this time, his wife and two of his children died. He married again, but little is known of his second wife, and they separated after only a short time. Eventually, as the result of his begging, the City Council and the Protestant community got together to provide him with some simple work that including making woodcuts of cityscapes and public events. There are indications that he may have been an alcoholic.

The altar was completed in 1555 with no obvious improvement in his financial situation. When he tried to give painting lessons there, to help pay off his debt, it led to many quarrels and he was ejected for breaking the rules. He died in 1559, still in poverty and debt.

His works may be found in Prague, Budapest, London and Munich as well as at the Regensburg Museum of History. The  in Neumarkt is named after him.

References

Further reading 
 Joseph Rudolf Schuegraf: Lebensgeschichtliche Nachrichten über den Maler und Bürger Michael Ostendorfer in Regensburg, 1850
 Hollstein's German Engravings, Etchings and Woodcuts 1400–1700. Vol. XXX = "Nehrlich to Ostendorfer". (Ed. Dr. Tilman Frank, Compiled By Robert Zijlma). Rosendaal, 1991. 
 Barbara Oettl: "Michael Ostendorfer – Ein reformierter Katholik in Regensburg", in: Berthold Furtmeyr. Meisterwerke der Buchmalerei und die Regensburger Kunst in Spätgotik und Renaissance, exhibition catalog, Historischen Museums Regensburg 2010/2011, Ed. by Christoph Wagner and Klemens Unger, Regensburg 2010,  pgs.516–525.
 Rosa Micus: "Der Reformationsaltar von Michael Ostendorfer 1554/55", in: Verhandlungen des Historischen Vereins für Oberpfalz und Regensburg, 2011, pgs.51–69.
 Susanne Wegmann: "Die Zeremonien der Kirche als gemalte Worte. Die Altarretabel von Lucas Cranach d. Ä. und Michael Ostendorfer in Wittenberg und Regensburg", in: Ritual und Reflexion. Historische Beträge zur Vermessung eines Spannungsfeldes, Ed. by Dominik Fugger, Benedikt Kranemann, Jenny Lagaude, Darmstadt 2015,  pgs.55–70.
 Michael Ostendorfer und die Reformation in Regensburg, exhibition catalog, Historischen Museum, 2017, Ed. by Christoph Wagner

External links 

 
 
 
 Informationsangebot des Ostendorfer-Gymnasiums Neumarkt zu Ostendorfer

16th-century German painters
People from Swabia (Bavaria)
1490s births
1559 deaths